Shitfun is the fourth studio album by Autopsy, released in 1995. In 2003, it was re-released with ten bonus live tracks.

Track listing

Personnel
Autopsy
Chris Reifert - Vocals, Drums, Bass on 3,5,7,10,13,18,19
Danny Coralles - Guitar, Bass on 8,11
Eric Cutler - Guitar, Bass on 1,2,9,14,17,21

Additional musicians
Freeway Migliore - Bass on 6,12,15,16
Clint Bower - Bass on 4,20
 Petri Toivonen - Backing scream on 5
 Mika Toivonen - Confession on 13

Autopsy (band) albums
1995 albums